Woman of Malacca (French: La dame de Malacca) is a 1937 French drama film directed by Marc Allégret and starring Edwige Feuillère, Pierre Richard-Willm and Betty Daussmond. It was based on a 1935 novel by the French writer Francis de Croisset. It was a major success on its initial release.

It was shot at the Epinay Studios in Paris. The film's sets were designed by the art director Jacques Krauss. A separate German-language version Another World was also made.

Synopsis
A young Englishwoman, Audrey Greenwood, marries an army officer to escape her dreary life as a school teacher. Accompanying her husband out for colonial service in Malacca, she soon grows unhappy with her marriage, and falls in love with a local sultan, Prince Selim.

Cast
 Edwige Feuillère as Audrey Greenwood 
 Pierre Richard-Willm as Prince Selim 
 Betty Daussmond as Lady Lyndstone 
 Jacques Copeau as Lord Brandmore 
 Gabrielle Dorziat as Lady Brandmore 
 Jean Debucourt as Sir Eric Temple 
 Jean Wall as Le major Carter 
 Liliane Lesaffre as Lady Johnson 
 Ky Duyen as Le japonais 
 Foun-Sen as La servante 
 William Aguet as Gerald 
 Alexandre Mihalesco as Sirdae Raman 
 René Bergeron as Le Docteur 
 Magdeleine Bérubet as Mademoiselle Tramont 
 Charlotte Clasis as Une amie d'Audrey 
 Marthe Mellot as La sous-maîtresse de l'institut Tramont 
 Robert Ozanne as Un journaliste 
 René Fleur as Un journaliste 
 Michèle Lahaye as Une dame anglaise 
 Colette Proust as Une dame anglaise

References

Bibliography
 Kennedy-Karpat, Colleen. Rogues, Romance, and Exoticism in French Cinema of the 1930s. Fairleigh Dickinson, 2013.
 Passerini, Luisa, Labanyi, Jo & Diehl, Karen. Europe and Love in Cinema. Intellect Books, 2012.

External links
 

1937 films
1937 drama films
French drama films
1930s French-language films
Films directed by Marc Allégret
French black-and-white films
Films based on French novels
Films based on works by Francis de Croisset
Films set in England
Films set in Malaysia
French multilingual films
Films shot at Epinay Studios
1937 multilingual films
1930s French films